Tipperary South may refer to:
 South Tipperary, a former county in Ireland
 Tipperary South (Dáil constituency), a former parliamentary constituency represented in Dáil Éireann
 Tipperary South (UK Parliament constituency), a UK Parliament constituency in Ireland